Julio Roberto Herrera Pumayauli (born 21 October 1956) is a Peruvian politician and a former Congressman, elected in the 2006 elections to represent Lima for the 2006–2011 term. Herrera belongs to the Peruvian Aprista Party. He did not run in the 2011 elections and retired from politics.

References 

 Official Congressional Site

Living people
1956 births
American Popular Revolutionary Alliance politicians
Members of the Congress of the Republic of Peru

People from Lima